Arif Hossain Moon (born 6 January 1968) is a retired Bangladeshi footballer who played as a Centre Back. Moon spent most of his club career with Brothers Union and also captained them along with Bangladesh national football team.

Early life
Moon was born on 6 January 1968 in Chikonmati, Domar Upazila of Nilphamari (then Rangpur), Bangladesh and spent his childhood there. His father Mohammad Anwar Hussain was a renowned lawyer and politician. His father was also the president of Nilphamari district branch of Bangladesh Awami League.

Club career
In 1986, Moon started his career with Adamjee Jute Mills in the Dhaka First Division League (then second-tier, later merged with the Dhaka League). In 1987, Adamjee were promoted to the Dhaka League and Moon was able to make his top-tier debut that season.

Moon's next destination was Brothers Union, joining the club in 1989. In 1991 he was named the club captain. The young Brothers team made history by defeating Mohammedan SC, in the final of the 1991 Federation Cup and Moon was an integral part of the defence, as his side managed to stop Mohammedan's star-studded attack consisting of Azamat Abduraimov, in the final.

In 1994, with the country's three well supported clubs– Abahani, Mohammedan SC and Brothers Union agreeing upon reducing player salaries, Moon along with many other national team players joined Muktijoddha Sangsad KC, which was at the time directed by politician and ex-Bangladesh Army major, Manzur Quader. However, Moon was unable to win the Dhaka League career, during his 11-year career. The 1994 Federation Cup trophy he won with Muktijoddha was the last title he won before retiring in 1997.

International career
In 1989, Moon made his unofficial debut for the national team during Bangladesh Red's President's Gold Cup triumph. Moon went onto represent his country during both the 1994 FIFA World Cup qualifiers and 1995 South Asian Gold Cup.

During the 1993 South Asian Games, Moon was surprisingly named the Bangladesh national football team captain, even with the presence of experienced players Monem Munna and Rizvi Karim Rumi. The decision made by Swiss coach Oldrich Svab was heavily criticized after Bangladesh crasehed out of the competition without a single victory.

Retirement
In 2012, almost a decade after ending his playing career, he was elected as a member of the executive council of Bangladesh Football Federation (BFF). In 2018, he played a major role in the development of the Nilphamari District Stadium (now Sheikh Kamal Stadium) at a cost of Tk 16 crore funded by the Asian Football Confederation. Like his father, Moon is involved in politics with Bangladesh Awami League. He served as the joint general secretary of Awami League Nilphamari district branch. After being elected to the BFF executive committee in 2020, Moon resigned on 6 March 2023, stating that he could not continue due to personal reasons.

Honours
Brothers Union
 Federation Cup: 1991

Muktijoddha Sangsad KC
 Federation Cup: 1994

References

External links 
 

Living people
1968 births
Muktijoddha Sangsad KC players
Brothers Union players
Bangladeshi footballers
Bangladesh international footballers
Bangladesh youth international footballers
Association football defenders